Miller Woods is the far western unit of Indiana Dunes National Park in the lakefront community of Miller Beach, Indiana.  Miller Woods is home to the federally endangered Karner Blue butterfly and the federally threatened Pitcher's thistle.  Miller Woods is also the only part of the National Park that also adjoins the Grand Calumet River.

The northern part of Miller Woods adjoins Lake Michigan, and includes foredunes and high dunes, as well as blowouts and pannes.  The southern and larger part of Miller Woods consists of rolling ridge and swale, with beach ridges dominated by oak savanna. This southern part is also traversed by current and former rail lines.  The northern and southern parts are divided by the Grand Calumet River, including the westernmost of the three lagoons that mark the river's modern-day headwaters and former mouth.

History

Miller Woods was the site of some of Henry Chandler Cowles' earliest observations on ecological succession in the late 19th century.  Subsequently, it was acquired by US Steel for industrial use, and a number of railroads and spur lines were laid through the area.  This had an unintended beneficial impact for the local oak savanna ecology; the sparks thrown off by passing trains maintained the fire cycle that was suppressed in most other parts of the Indiana Dunes during the 20th century.

The area was acquired by the National Park Service through an expansion bill passed in 1976.  The bill was passed in honor of Senator Paul Douglas, who was then on his deathbed, and the Douglas name was applied to the large environmental education center that now stands at the entrance to Miller Woods.

Flora and fauna

Miller Woods is home to at least 287 species of animals and plants.  Among them are several species found nowhere else in the Dunes, including the fame flower. The area is known for its brilliant displays of wildflowers such as columbine and sundial lupine.

Mammals
Virginia opossum
short-tailed shrew
masked shrew
eastern mole
cottontail rabbit
white-footed mouse
prairie deer mouse
meadow vole
muskrat
fox squirrel
Southern flying squirrel
gray squirrel
thirteen-lined ground squirrel
red squirrel
raccoon
long-tailed weasel
white-tailed deer
coyote
beaver
groundhog

See also
Indiana Dunes National Park
Long Lake (Indiana)

References
Footnotes

General

External links
Visitor's guide

Indiana Dunes National Park
Geography of Gary, Indiana